Edmund Gilbert Baker (1864–1949) was a British plant collector and botanist. He was the son of John Gilbert Baker.

Works
 Synopsis of Malveae, 1895
 The plants of Milanji, Nyassa-land. Con James Britten. 1894
 Catalogue of the Plants collected by Mr. & Mrs. P.A. Talbot in the Oban district, South Nigeria. London (impreso por orden de Trustees, British Museum (Natural History)
 Leguminosae of Tropical Africa, part 1, [1]-215, in 1926; part 2, [i-iii], 216-607, Jul 1929; part 3, [i-iii], 608-693, from 1930.

Among species he named are Banksia burdettii and Banksia ashbyi.

References

1864 births
1949 deaths
English botanists
Fellows of the Linnean Society of London